Triaxomera baldensis is a moth of the family Tineidae. It only known from Italy.

The wingspan is about 19 mm.

References

Moths described in 1983
Nemapogoninae